The Saline River is a tributary of the Ohio River, approximately  long, in the Southern Illinois region of the U.S. state of Illinois. The major tributaries include the South Fork, Middle Fork and North Fork, all lying within the Saline Valley. The once meandering swampy river was important among Native Americans and early settlers as a source of salt from numerous salt springs where it was commercially extracted in the early 19th century.

History
From 1807 to 1818, Illinois paid the United States Treasury $28,160.25 in revenue. During the same time, Ohio paid $240 and Indiana, Kentucky and Missouri paid nothing. One third of the State of Illinois revenue came from the salt industry coming from African American slaves working on the Saline River in 1818.
The last concessionaire of the Saline Springs was John Crenshaw, then owner of what became known as the Old Slave House.

During the late 18th century, the river had heavy barge traffic. The farthest point west that could still accommodate flat boats and barges is the largest city on the river Harrisburg, Illinois, but the river has not been used for navigation in almost a century. It is today used mainly as an oversized drainage ditch of little interest except for flood control.

Bidding for straightening and dredging began in 1930.

On June 18, 1888, an act of January 25, 1849, declaring the Saline River to be navigable, was repealed by the Illinois General Assembly. The river was deemed "impractical" for navigation due to the "anxiousness" of County residents to build bridges across it.

Watershed
The river is formed by the confluence of the South Fork and the Middle Fork east of Harrisburg.

In 1995, stream quality was rated as "Fair" to "Good". Causes of pollution include inorganics, nutrients, siltation, organic enrichment (low dissolved oxygen) and other habitat alterations attributed to agricultural runoff, hydrologic/habitat modification and resource extraction. The North and Middle forks of the Saline River system have a degraded Indiana crayfish population due to threats to water quality from pollution, coal mining, oil extraction, siltation, stream channelization. and clearing.

The watershed covers land within Hamilton, White, Franklin, Williamson, Gallatin, Johnson, Pope, Hardin, and Saline Counties.

The population of the watershed is mostly rural, but there are many small cities and villages found throughout the area then passes through the eastern section of the Shawnee National Forest. The largest population centers are the cities of Harrisburg (pop. 9,628), Eldorado (pop. 4,416), McLeansboro (pop. 2,945), and Carrier Mills (pop. 1,886). Agriculture, mining, and manufacturing are the major components of the regional economy. The cities of Equality and Harrisburg, Illinois were built on sandstone bluffs overlooking the Saline River Middle Fork Valley.

Cities and counties
The following cities and towns are drained by the Saline River:

South Fork
Carrier Mills
Goreville
Lakeview
Stonefort
New Burnside

Middle Fork
Eldorado
Equality
Galatia
Harrisburg
Raleigh

North Fork
McLeansboro
Norris City

The watershed includes all or part of the following counties:

Franklin County
Hardin County
Johnson County
Saline County
White County
Hamilton County
Williamson County
Gallatin County
Pope County

See also
List of rivers of Illinois
Tuttle Bottoms Monster
Watersheds of Illinois

References

External links
Prairie Rivers Network
Surfing the Saline River with USEPA
Real Time USGS Stream Flow
Illinois Department of Natural Resources Fact Sheet

Rivers of Illinois
Tributaries of the Ohio River
Bodies of water of Saline County, Illinois
Bodies of water of Williamson County, Illinois